Berenice II Euergetis (267 or 266 BC – 221 BC; , Berenikē Euergetis, "Berenice the Benefactress") was queen regnant of Cyrenaica from 258 BC to 246 BC and co-regent queen of Ptolemaic Egypt from 246 BC to 222 BC as the wife of Ptolemy III.

She married Demetrius, thus giving him the throne of Cyrenaica, on the death of her father Magas in 250/249 BC. After a short power struggle with her mother, Berenice married her half-cousin Ptolemy III, the third ruler of the Ptolemaic kingdom. This marriage led to the re-incorporation of Cyrenaica into the Ptolemaic empire. As queen of Egypt, Berenice participated actively in government, was incorporated into the Ptolemaic state cult alongside her husband and worshipped as a goddess in her own right. She is best known for sacrificing her hair as a votive offering, which led to the constellation Coma Berenices being named after her. Berenice was murdered by the regent Sosibius shortly after the accession of her son Ptolemy IV Philopator in 221 BC.

Life

Cyrenaica had been incorporated into the Ptolemaic realm in 323 BC, by Ptolemy I Soter shortly after the death of Alexander the Great. The region proved difficult to control and around 300 BC, Ptolemy I entrusted the region to Magas, son of his wife Berenice I by an earlier marriage. After Ptolemy I's death, Magas asserted his independence and engaged in warfare with his successor Ptolemy II Philadelphus. Around 275 BC, Magas married Apama, who came from the Seleucid dynasty, which had become enemies of the Ptolemies. Berenice II was their only child. When Ptolemy II renewed his efforts to reach a settlement with Magas of Cyrene in the late 250s BC, it was agreed that Berenice would be married to her half-cousin, the future Ptolemy III, who was Ptolemy II's heir.

The astronomer Gaius Julius Hyginus claims that when Berenice's father Magas and his troops were routed in battle, Berenice mounted a horse, rallied the remaining forces, killed many of the enemy, and drove the rest to retreat. The veracity of this story is unclear and the battle in question is not otherwise attested, but "it is not on the face of it impossible."

Queen of Cyrene
Berenice was hailed basilissa (queen) on coins even in her father's lifetime. According to coins of Berenice, the accession of Berenice as queen of Cyrene was in B.C. 258. King Magas died in circa 250 BC. At this point, Berenice's mother Apame refused to honour the marriage agreement with the Ptolemies and invited an Antigonid prince, Demetrius the Fair to Cyrene to marry Berenice instead. With Apame's help, Demetrius seized control of the city. Allegedly, Demetrius and Apame became lovers. Berenice is said to have discovered them in bed together and had him assassinated. Apame was spared. Control of Cyrene was then entrusted to a republican government, led by two Cyrenaeans named Ecdelus and Demophanes, until Berenice's actual wedding to Ptolemy III in 246 BC after his accession to the throne.

Queen of Egypt

Berenice married Ptolemy III in 246 BC after his accession to the throne. This brought Cyrenaica back into the Ptolemaic realm, where it would remain until her great-great-grandson Ptolemy Apion left it to the Roman Republic in his will in 96 BC.

Ruler cult
In 244 or 243 BC, Berenice and her husband were incorporated into the Ptolemaic state cults and worshipped as the Theoi Euergetai (Benefactor Gods), alongside Alexander the Great and the earlier Ptolemies. Berenice was also worshipped as a goddess on her own, Thea Euergetis (Benefactor Goddess). She was often equated with Aphrodite and Isis and came to be particularly associated with protection against shipwrecks. Most of the evidence for this cult derives from the reign of Ptolemy IV or later, but a cult in her honour is attested in the Fayyum in Ptolemy III's reign. This cult closely parallels that offered to her mother-in-law, Arsinoe II, who was also equated with Aphrodite and Isis, and associated with protection from shipwrecks. The parallelism is also presented on the gold coinage minted posthumously in honour of the two queens. The coinage of Arsinoe II bears a pair of cornucopiae on the reverse side, while that of Berenice bears a single cornucopia.

Berenice's Lock

Berenice's divinity is closely connected with the story of "Berenice's Lock". According to this story, Berenice vowed to sacrifice her long hair as a votive offering if Ptolemy III returned safely from battle during the Third Syrian War. She dedicated her tresses to and placed them in the temple at Cape Zephyrium in Alexandria, where Arsinoe II was worshipped as Aphrodite, but the next morning the tresses had disappeared. Conon of Samos, the court astronomer identified a constellation as the missing hair, claiming that Aphrodite had placed it in the sky as an acknowledgement of Berenice's sacrifice. The constellation is known to this day as Coma Berenices (Latin for 'Berenice's Lock'). It is unclear whether this event took place before or after Ptolemy's return; Branko van Oppen de Ruiter suggests that it happened after Ptolemy's return (around March–June or May 245 BC). This episode served to link Berenice with the goddess Isis in her role as goddess of rebirth, since she was meant to have dedicated a lock of her own hair at Koptos in mourning for her husband Osiris.

The story was widely propagated by the Ptolemaic court. Seals were produced depicting Berenice with a shaved head and the attributes of Isis/Demeter. The poet Callimachus, who was based in the Ptolemaic court, celebrated the event in a poem, The Lock of Berenice, of which only a few lines remain. The first century BC Roman poet Catullus produced a loose translation or adaptation of the poem in Latin, and a prose summary appears in Hyginus' De Astronomica. The story was popular in the early modern period, when it was illustrated by many neoclassical painters.

Panhellenic Games
Berenice entered a chariot team in the Nemean Games of 243 or 241 BC and was victorious. The success is celebrated in another poem by Callimachus' Victory of Berenice. This poem connects Berenice with Io, a lover of Zeus in Greek mythology, who was also connected with Isis by contemporary Greeks. When she won in the four-horse chariot race at the Olympics in the early third century BC, she commissioned an epigram by the poet Posidippus in which she explicitly claimed to have "stolen" the fame (κῦδος) of Cynisca. Her epigram was included in the so-called Greek Anthology, which also indicates its continuing relevance long after the victory itself.

Death 
Ptolemy III died in late 222 BC and was succeeded by his son by Berenice, Ptolemy IV Philopator. Berenice died soon after, in early 221 BC. Polybius states that she was poisoned, as part of a general purge of the royal family by the new king's regent Sosibius. She continued to be venerated in the state ruler cult. By 211 BC, she had her own priestess, the athlophorus ('prize-bearer'), who marched in processions in Alexandria behind the priest of Alexander the Great and the Ptolemies, and the canephorus of the deified Arsinoe II.

Legacy
The city of Euesperides (now the Libyan city of Benghazi) was renamed Berenice in her honour, a name it retained until the Middle Ages.

The asteroid 653 Berenike, discovered in 1907, also is named after Queen Berenice.

Issue
With Ptolemy III she had the following children:

References

Bibliography

External links

 Bevan, E.R., The House of Ptolemy, Methuen Publishing, London, 1927 - Chapter 3, "The Second Ptolemy, "Philadelphus"

3rd-century BC Pharaohs
Queens consort of the Ptolemaic dynasty
Remarried royal consorts
3rd-century BC Greek women
260s BC births
221 BC deaths
3rd-century BC Greek people
3rd-century BC Egyptian people
Female pharaohs
3rd-century BC Egyptian women
3rd-century BC women rulers
Ancient Greek sportspeople
Sportswomen in antiquity